The Mankessim Kingdom (1252–1844) was a pre-colonial African state in modern-day Ghana. It is regarded as the heartland of the Fante people, and operated as capital of the Fante Confederacy in the 19th century. The town of Mankessim still exists, and is located in the Central Region of Ghana, about an hour and a half drive west of Accra. The Mankessim Kingdom's influence was quite vast; it extended to the whole of the Fante people, and at times the entire coast of modern-day Ghana.

History

Origin
The Fante people claim to have separated from the Bono people, around 1250 AD. This act became the origin of their name, "Fa-atsew" meaning "the half that left". The Fante left their Bono brethren at Krako, present day Techiman in the Bono East Region of Ghana, and became their own distinct Akan group. The Fante were led by three great warriors known as Obrumankoma, Odapagyan and Oson (to wit, the whale, the eagle and the elephant respectively). According to tradition, Obrumankoma and Odapagyan died during the exodus and were embalmed and carried along to the group's destination.

Oson led the people to what would become Mankessim in 1252. Legend has it that the Fante's chief fetish priest, Komfo Amona, planted a spear in the ground when they reached the location of the settlement. The spear is called the Akyin-Enyim, meaning "in front of god". The place became the meeting place for the Fante elders and the head fetish priest when discussing important matters. The first Omanhene (king) of Mankessim was installed here, and later kingmakers would visit the site for consultation. According to the Fante, the spear cannot be removed by mortal hands.

The land the Fante reached was initially called Adoakyir by its aboriginal inhabitants, which the Fante called "Etsi-fue-yifo" meaning people with bushy hair. The Fante conquered these people and renamed the settlement Oman-kesemu, meaning large town. The name has evolved into the current name, Mankessim.

The Fante settled the land as their first independent kingdom, and buried Obrumakankoma and Odapagyan in a sacred grove called Nana-nom-pow. Komfo Amona also planted the limb of a tree he had brought from the Akan homeland in Krako to see if a place was good for settlement. The day after the priest planted the limb, the people found a tree starting to grow. The tree was named Ebisa-dua, or the consulting tree, and its location is today one of the most important shrines in Mankessim.

Organization
The Fante quickly organized themselves into military groups, or companies, called Asafo, to defend themselves from non-Akan groups in the vicinity, as well as separate Akan groups - most notably the Ashanti in later centuries. Tradition has it that the Fante sub-groups Ekumfi, Abora, Enyan, Nkusukum and Kurentsir were the first to settle Mankessim. They were later joined by the Gomoa, Ajumako, Akatakyi and the Edina.

The Ashanti threat
In the early 19th century, the Asante Kingdom began expanding their control over Ghana, sending many people fleeing to the coast. Fante communities outside of Mankessim became targets of the Asante, and decided to unite in defense. In 1806, the first Asante–Fante War resulted in a humiliating defeat for the Fante. In 1811, the Fante again went to war with the Ashanti, again losing in open battle, but forcing a withdrawal by using guerrilla tactics. In 1816, the Asante expanded into the coast and absorbed the Fante. In 1844, the Fante placed themselves under British protection through the Bond of 1844, but were guaranteed self-governance. However, the British, and the Dutch on the coast, did little to recognize Fante sovereignty.

The Fante confederacy
Finally, in 1868, the Fante formed a confederacy of their own, with British backing, to guard against further Ashanti aggression. The Fante met in Mankessim and elected the kingdom's Omanhene as Brenyi over the Fante Confederacy. In 1871, the seven Fante kingdoms and 20 chiefdoms signed the Constitution of Mankessim, formalizing their alliance.

Omanhene Kwesi Edu led the confederacy for the whole of its short existence, acquiring the lands of neighboring Asebo, Cabesterra and Agona kingdoms. The confederacy was also successful in its resistance to the Ashanti, playing their arch-enemy off against their powerful British supporters. Mankessim, through the confederacy, monopolized trade on the coast and became an important economic force.

Decline
The early successes of the confederacy were short-lived, and a protracted war with the Dutch, backers of the Asante Confederacy, left them in ruins. In 1873, the British proclaimed the entire coast of Ghana (then known as the Gold Coast) a protectorate of the crown. The Fante dissolved their confederacy that same year in return for money, guns and a license to make war on any invading Asante on behalf of the British. Mankessim continued to hold cultural and political importance among the Fante, but was never again an independent force in the region.

Reference

Sources
Traveladdict
World Statesmen
Wiki Fante Confederacy

History of Ghana
Countries in medieval Africa
13th-century establishments in Africa